The 38th Virginia Infantry Regiment was an infantry regiment raised in Virginia for service in the Confederate States Army during the War Between the States. It fought mostly with the Army of Northern Virginia.

The 38th Virginia was organized in Pittsylvania County, Virginia in June 1861. Its members were recruited in Pittsylvania, Halifax, and Mecklenburg counties. It served under the command of Generals Early, Garland, Armistead, Barton, and Stuart. Among the founders of the regiment was Lt. Col. (later Colonel) Powhatan Bolling Whittle of Mecklenburg County, who was later wounded at the Battle of Williamsburg.

The 38th participated in the campaigns of the Army of Northern Virginia from Williamsburg to Gettysburg, then served in North Carolina. Later it was attached to the Department of Richmond, fought at Drewry's Bluff and Cold Harbor, endured the hardships of the Petersburg trenches, and ended the war at Appomattox.

The regiment totaled 544 effectives in April 1862, and sustained 9 casualties at Williamsburg, 147 at Seven Pines, 94 at Malvern Hill, and 16 in the Maryland Campaign. More than fifty-five percent of the 400 engaged at Gettysburg were disabled and it reported 11 killed, 30 wounded, and 10 missing at Drewry's Bluff. The unit surrendered 12 officers and 82 men.

Its commanders were Colonels Joseph R. Cabell, Edward Claxton Edmonds, George K. Griggs, and Powhatan Whittle; Lieutenant Colonel George A. Martin; and Majors Isaac H. Carrington and Henderson L. Lee.

Thomas Benton Fitzgerald, founder of Dan River Inc., served in Company A of the 38th Virginia.

See also
List of Virginia War Between the States units

References

Units and formations of the Confederate States Army from Virginia
1861 establishments in Virginia
Military units and formations established in 1861
1865 disestablishments in Virginia
Military units and formations disestablished in 1865